Little Portugal (also known as Portugal Village; Portuguese: Pequeno Portugal/aldeia Portugal) is a neighbourhood and ethnic enclave in Toronto, Ontario, Canada. It is located west of downtown in the "Old" City of Toronto. It is bound on the west by Lansdowne Avenue, on the north by College Street, on the east by Ossington Avenue and on the south by the Go Transit and Union Pearson Express railway tracks. The area is mainly residential, with Portuguese businesses along Dundas Street West and College Street. The area west of Dufferin Street was a part of the former Town of Brockton. The area to the east of Dufferin and south of Dundas Street is also known as "Beaconsfield Village" dating back to the days of the sub-division of lots in the area around Beaconsfield Avenue.

Character

Little Portugal is predominantly a residential area. The largest ethnic group are Portuguese and numbers of Portuguese storefronts are located along College and Dundas Streets, giving the area its name. There is a fine stock of mid-century homes.

A major hub of activity in the area today is McCormick Park, home to McCormick Recreation Centre and Arena on Brock Avenue. This area has long been a focal point for youth living in the area.

Demographics
The area has many residents of Portuguese and more recently Brazilian backgrounds. The second largest language group used after Portuguese are Chinese, Spanish, and Vietnamese. Above 50% of the population in Little Portugal identify as Portuguese.

Transportation
The area is well-served by the TTC. There are the 505 and 506 streetcar lines along Dundas and College. There are north-south bus lines on Lansdowne, Dufferin, and Ossington.

Main streets
Dundas Street West is a four-lane east-west arterial road running through the centre of the neighbourhood. From Ossington Avenue west the street is known as Rua Açores. There are storefronts along most of the street and are primarily local businesses. College Street West is a four-lane arterial road approximately a quarter-mile north of Dundas meeting Dundas at its western end just west of Lansdowne Avenue. It has storefronts along most of its length. College Street has several areas of Portuguese restaurants and bars east and west of Dufferin Avenue.

In 2006, the businesses on Dundas Street from the CNR tracks on the west to Rusholme Road on the east organized the 'Dundas West Business Improvement Area.' In 2007, the 'Little Portugal Business Improvement Area' was formed for the stretch of businesses along Dundas Street from Rusholme Road (just east of Dufferin) to Roxton Road (one block east of Ossington) on the east.

Schools
 Shirley Street Public School - Junior Elementary
 Alexander Muir/Gladstone Avenue Public - Junior and Senior Elementary
 St. Helen's Catholic School- Catholic Elementary School
 Ossington/Old Orchard Junior Public School

See also

Portuguese Canadians

References

External links

 Little Portugal neighbourhood profile

Neighbourhoods in Toronto
Portuguese neighborhoods
Ethnic enclaves in Ontario
European-Canadian culture in Toronto
Portuguese-Canadian culture